Saint-Médard-en-Forez (literally Saint-Médard in Forez) is a commune in the Loire département in central France.

Population

See also
Communes of the Loire department

References

Communes of Loire (department)